Akash Choolun (born 20 September 1978) is a Mauritian former international footballer who played as a goalkeeper. He won one cap for the Mauritius national football team in 2002.

References

1982 births
Living people
Mauritian footballers
Mauritius international footballers
Association football goalkeepers
AS Rivière du Rempart players